Wolfgang Riesinger (born 8 January 1951) is a German long-distance runner. He competed in the men's 5000 metres at the 1972 Summer Olympics.

References

1951 births
Living people
Athletes (track and field) at the 1972 Summer Olympics
German male long-distance runners
Olympic athletes of West Germany
Place of birth missing (living people)
20th-century German people